David or Dave Ferguson may refer to:
David Ferguson (reformer) (died 1598), Scottish religious reformer
David Ferguson (Australian politician) (1844–1891)
David Ferguson (geologist) (c. 1857–1936), Scottish explorer, mining engineer and prospector
Sir David Ferguson (judge) (1861–1941), Australian judge
Dave Ferguson (footballer, born 1875) (1875–1920), Australian rules footballer for Essendon
Dave Ferguson (footballer, born 1903) (1903–1975), Australian rules footballer for Geelong and North Melbourne
David Ferguson (impresario) (born 1947), American promoter and outsider-culture impresario
David R. Ferguson (born 1962), American sound engineer and record producer
Dave Ferguson (boxer) (born 1976), British boxer
David Ferguson (volleyball) (born 1982), Australian volleyball player
David Ferguson (footballer, born 1994), English footballer for Hartlepool United
David Ferguson (footballer, born 1996), Scottish footballer for Berwick Rangers

See also
David Fergusson (disambiguation)
David Ferguson Hunter (1891–1965), Scottish soldier and recipient of the Victoria Cross
Samuel David Ferguson (1842–1916), African American bishop